Downtown West is an official neighborhood in Minneapolis, part of the larger Central community. It is the heart of downtown Minneapolis (and Minneapolis as a whole), containing the bulk of high-rise office buildings in the city, and is what comes to mind when most Minneapolitans think of "downtown".

Its boundaries are as follows (going in a clockwise direction): 12th Street to the southwest, 3rd Avenue North, Washington Avenue North, and Hennepin Avenue to the northwest, the Mississippi River to the northeast, and Portland Avenue, 5th Street South, and 5th Avenue South to the southeast. It is bordered by the North Loop, Nicollet Island/East Bank, Downtown East, Elliot Park, and Loring Park neighborhoods. Downtown West is home to most of Minneapolis's most notable buildings like the Foshay Tower and IDS Center. Being next to the neighborhood Loring Park which has a substantial population of gay people, it is unsurprising that Downtown West has a few gay bars such as The Saloon.

References

External links
Minneapolis Neighborhood Profile - Downtown West
7th Ward, City of Minneapolis
Downtown Minneapolis Neighborhood Association
Warehouse District Business Association (WDBA)
Minneapolis Downtown Council

Minnesota populated places on the Mississippi River
Neighborhoods in Minneapolis
Economy of Minneapolis
Minneapolis